Merimnetria is a genus of moths in the family Gelechiidae. It was first described by Lord Walsingham in 1907. All species are endemic to Hawaii.

Species
Subgenus Aristoteliodes Zimmerman, 1978
Merimnetria arcuata (Walsingham, 1907)
Merimnetria compsodelta (Meyrick, 1928)
Merimnetria elegantior (Walsingham, 1907)
Merimnetria epermeniella (Walsingham, 1907)
Merimnetria gigantea (Swezey, 1913)
Merimnetria gratula (Meyrick, 1928)
Merimnetria homoxyla (Meyrick, 1928)
Merimnetria ichthyochroa (Walsingham, 1907)
Merimnetria lanaiensis (Walsingham, 1907)
Merimnetria maculaticornis (Walsingham, 1907)
Merimnetria mendax (Walsingham, 1907)
Merimnetria multiformis (Meyrick, 1928)
Merimnetria nigriciliella (Walsingham, 1907)
Merimnetria notata (Walsingham, 1907)
Merimnetria thurifica (Meyrick, 1928)
Merimnetria xylospila (Meyrick, 1928)
Subgenus Merimnetria
Merimnetria flaviterminella Walsingham, 1907
Merimnetria straussiella (Swezey, 1953)

Furthermore, there are at least three undescribed species.

External links

 
Anomologinae
Endemic moths of Hawaii